The Siegfried Lenz Prize is intended to honor international writers who have achieved recognition for their narrative work and whose creative work is close to the spirit of Siegfried Lenz. The award is endowed with €50,000. The jury consists of five members. The award ceremony takes place in the Hamburg City Hall. The prize is presented every two years by the First Mayor of the Free and Hanseatic City of Hamburg and the Siegfried Lenz Foundation. Shortly before his death, Lenz set up a foundation in his name, which also awards the prize.

Recipients
Source:

 2014 Amos Oz
 2016 Julian Barnes
 2018 Richard Ford
 2020 Lyudmila Ulitskaya
 2022 Elizabeth Strout

References

External links
 

German literary awards
Awards established in 2014
2014 establishments in Germany